Sir Benjamin Bathurst (1639 – 1704) was a British politician, a slave trader, a Governor of the East India and Levant companies and a Cofferer of the Royal Household.

He was born the 6th surviving son of George Bathurst of Theddingworth, Leicestershire and his first wife Elizabeth Villiers of Hothorpe Hall, Northamptonshire. His family were supporters of King Charles I  and after the latter's execution, he chose to move to live in Cadiz.

On his return to England as a wealthy man he married  Frances Apsley, a close friend of Princess Anne, who obtained for him a position as Treasurer of her Household, which he retained despite mounting evidence over the years that he was embezzling money from Anne and her husband. He bought the manor of Paulerspury in Northamptonshire and became a London Alderman. He was also made Treasurer to the Duke of York (later James II of England) and in 1682 was knighted.

He entered Parliament in 1685 to represent New Romney as a government nominee, but then chose to represent Bere Alston instead, for which he had also been elected. He held that seat until the election of 1689.

He was deputy governor of the East India Company in 1686-68 and 1695–96 and governor in 1688–90. He was a deputy-governor of the Royal Africa Company in 1680–82 and a sub-governor in 1682–4, 1685-6 and 1689–90. He was deputy governor of the Levant Company in 1686-87 and governor in 1688–89 and 1695. He was also Deputy Governor of the Leeward Islands.

In 1702, on the accession of Queen Anne,  he was appointed Cofferer of the Household and again elected to Parliament to represent New Romney, holding both positions until his death in 1704. Although Anne had been convinced of his dishonesty for several years, her friendship with his wife seems to have secured his position.

He had married Frances, the daughter of Sir Allen Apsley of Westminster and Frances Petre, and had 3 sons and a daughter. His 3 sons all became MPs themselves and were Allen Bathurst, 1st Earl Bathurst (born 1684), Peter Bathurst (1687) and Benjamin Bathurst (1692).

Involvement in the slave trade 
With his senior appointments in the Royal Africa Company and the East India Company, Bathurst was heavily involved in the slave trade. The Royal Africa Company was set up in 1660 to trade along the west coast of Africa. It shipped approximately 100,000 African slaves to the Americas (primarily the Caribbean) as part of the total Atlantic slave trade of 3.1 million by British and Portuguese traders. In 1700, Bathurst purchased Cirencester Park with earnings from commodities including Gold, Silver, cloth and spices as well as the proceeds of slavery. It is still owned by the Bathurst family. When Bathurst died, he left a fortune great enough to endow all three of his sons with country estates.

See also
 List of East India Company directors

References

|-

|-

1630s births
1704 deaths
People from Harborough District
English MPs 1685–1687
English MPs 1702–1705
Knights Bachelor
Benjamin
Members of the Parliament of England for Bere Alston
English slave traders
17th-century English businesspeople